Franklin Township Community School Corporation (FTCSC) is a public school district in Franklin Township, Marion County, Indiana, United States. It is responsible for seven  elementary schools, two intermediate schools, one junior high, and one high school. The school district's current enrollment is about 8,700 students. Adding to its total, the district built one more elementary school, and a freshman academy addition, which opened in 2009, at the high school to keep up with continued growth.

Demographics

According to the Indiana Department of Education, the district's enrollment population is 82.1% White, 6% Black, 4.9% Multiracial, 4% Hispanic, 2.8% Asian, and 0.3% Native American. The district's gender ratio is 49.2% females to 50.8% males.

Schools

See also
 List of school districts in Indiana

External links
 Franklin Township Community School Corporation
 FTCSC School Board Meeting Minutes Archive
 FTCSC School Board Policy
 Franklin Township Community School Corporation: Calendar of Events
 Corporation Snapshot, Franklin Township Com Sch Corp #5310

References 

Education in Indianapolis
Education in Marion County, Indiana
School districts in Indiana
1950 establishments in Indiana
School districts established in 1950